The Bebelplatz (formerly and colloquially the Opernplatz) is a public square in the central Mitte district of Berlin, the capital of Germany.

The square is located on the south side of the Unter den Linden boulevard, a major east-west thoroughfare that runs through Berlin's city center. It is bounded to the east by the State Opera building (hence its prewar name), to the west by buildings of Humboldt University, and to the southeast by St. Hedwig's Cathedral, the first Catholic church built in Prussia after the Reformation. Following the war, the square was renamed after August Bebel, a founder of the Social Democratic Party of Germany.

History

Early history
The square, then called Platz am Opernhaus (i.e. square at the opera house), was laid out between 1741 and 1743 under the rule of King Frederick II of Prussia. On 12 August 1910, it was renamed for Emperor Francis Joseph I of Austria (Kaiser-Franz-Josef-Platz) on the occasion of his 80th birthday. The buildings surrounding the square were subsequently largely destroyed in World War II by air raids and the Battle of Berlin. The ensemble was restored in the 1950s, and the square was renamed on 31 August 1947 as Bebelplatz.

Nazi book burning

The Bebelplatz is known as the site of one of the infamous Nazi book burning ceremonies held in the evening of 10 May 1933 in many German university cities. The book burnings were initiated and hosted by the nationalist German Student Association, thus stealing a march on the National Socialist German Students' League.  The assembly of the books had started on the sixth, when students dragged the contents of the  Institute for the Science of Sexuality library into the square.  At the Student Association's invitation Propaganda Minister Joseph Goebbels held an inflammatory speech prior to the burning. Besides other spectators, it was attended by members of the Nazi Students' League, the SA ("brownshirts"), SS and Hitler Youth groups. They burned around 20,000 books, including works by Heinrich Mann, Erich Maria Remarque, Heinrich Heine, Karl Marx, Albert Einstein and many other authors. Erich Kästner, whose books were also among those burned, was present at the scene and described it with bitter irony in his diary.

The Empty Library, a Memorial in memory of the burning of books by Micha Ullman consisting of a glass plate set into the cobblestones, gives a view of a group of empty bookcases large enough to hold all 20,000 burned books; its purpose is to commemorate the book burning. Furthermore, a line of Heinrich Heine from his play, Almansor (1821), is engraved on a plaque inset in the square: "Das war ein Vorspiel nur, dort wo man Bücher verbrennt, verbrennt man am Ende auch Menschen." (in English: "That was only a prelude; where they burn books, they will in the end also burn people"). Students at Humboldt University hold a book sale in the square every year to mark the anniversary.

Recent history
In 2006, an exhibition of "United Buddy Bears" was held in the square, for the third time in Berlin. The exhibition consisted of more than 180 bear sculptures, each  in height and designed by a different artist. Due to its difficult past the use of Bebelplatz remains disputed, recently sparked off by a wintry skating rink and a party tent of the Berlin fashion week.

In 2012 several protests were caused by the announced plan of an underground carpark serving the attendees of the opera to be erected under the square and around the subsurface memorial.

See also
 Blücher Memorial, Berlin
 Bülow Memorial, Berlin
 Gneisenau Memorial, Berlin
 Scharnhorst Memorial, Berlin
 Yorck Memorial, Berlin

References

External links 

 Panorama Bebelplatz - Interactive 360° Panorama

Buildings and structures in Mitte
Rebuilt buildings and structures in Berlin
Squares in Berlin